Ellison is a surname and given name. It may derive from "Son of Elias" in Norwegian. Ellison can also be spelled Ellisson, Elison, Elisson, Ellyson, Ellysson, Elyson, and Elysson.

People with the surname 
 Andy Ellison, British musician
 Atiyyah Ellison (born 1981), American football player
 Brooke Ellison (born 1979), American politician
 Casey Ellison, American actor
 Chase Ellison (born 1993), American actor
 Chris Ellison (disambiguation), multiple individuals
 David Ellison, American film producer
 Debbie Ellison, Playboy model
 Eddie Ellison, English detective
 Eileen Ellison, Grand Prix racer
 Frank Ellison, American model railroader
 George Ellison (disambiguation), multiple individuals
 Glenn Ellison, American professor
Grace Ellison (died 1935), British journalist
 Harlan Ellison, writer
 Harold John Ellison, US naval ensign
 James Ellison (actor)
 James Ellison (footballer, born 1901)
 James Ellison (motorcycle racer)
 James T. Ellison, New York gangster
 Jason Ellison, Major League Baseball outfielder
 Jennifer Ellison (born 1983), British actress
 Jeremiah Ellison, member of the Minneapolis City Council
 Joseph Ellison, Royal Navy officer.
 Keith Ellison (football), American football player
 Keith Ellison, member of the United States House of Representatives and Attorney General from Minnesota 
 Larry Ellison, co-founder and CEO of Oracle Corporation
 Lorraine Ellison, singer
 Matt Ellison, Canadian ice hockey player 
 Megan Ellison, American film producer
 Mervyn A. Ellison, Irish astronomer
 Paul Ellison, bassist
 Pervis Ellison, American basketball player
 Peter T. Ellison (born 1951), American anthropologist
 Ralph Ellison, Author of Invisible Man
 Richard Ellison (cricketer)
 Richard Ellison (politician) (1754–1827), British Member of Parliament (MP)
 Riki Ellison, New Zealand-American football player
 Robert Ellison (disambiguation), multiple individuals
 Scott Ellison (born 1954), American electric blues guitarist, singer and songwriter.
 Sheila Ellison, American author on parenting and relationships
 Thomas Ellison, New Zealand rugby player
 Thomas Ellison (mutineer), English seaman 
 William Ellison-Macartney (1852–1924), British and Australian politician
 William Frederick Archdall Ellison, Irish astronomer and clergyman

People with the given name
 Ellison Barber, American journalist
 Ellison Brown (1913-1975), U.S. Olympian
 Ellison Hatfield, the younger brother of Devil Anse Hatfield, murdered by three sons of Randolph McCoy during the Hatfield-McCoy feud
 Ellison "Cotton Top" Mounts, the illegitimate son of Ellison Hatfield, whose hanging is often seen as the end of the Hatfield-McCoy feud.
 Ellison Onizuka (1946-1986), American astronaut killed on the Space Shuttle Challenger
 Ellison D. Smith (1864-1944), American politician
 Ellison G. Smith (1854-1935), a justice of the South Dakota Supreme Court.
 Ellison Capers, Confederate general in the American Civil War.

See also
 Ellison (band), an indie rock band from Cincinnati, Ohio
 Ellison (crater), a lunar impact crater on the far side of the Moon
 Ellison Bay, Wisconsin
 Ellis

Given names
English-language given names
English-language surnames
Patronymic surnames
Norwegian-language surnames